"Fast" is a song by American rapper and singer Juice Wrld, released on March 8, 2019, as the fifth track from his second studio album Death Race for Love.

Composition
On "Fast", Juice Wrld reflects on how his life has taken off since fame and how fast the world is moving around him.

Music video
The video is kept pretty straightforward, placing more emphasis on the striking visual effects rather than a narrative. There are close-up shots of Juice delivering his verses, a few race car scenes, and a touch of macrophilia. The bright colors and streaks of moving light continue the album's racing theme.
The video was directed by Alexandre Moors and have more than 78 million views as of June 2022.

Credits and personnel
Credits adapted from Tidal.
 Jarad Higgins – vocals, songwriting, composition
 Andrew Wotman – songwriting, composition, production
 Adam Feeney – songwriting, composition, production
 Louis Bell – songwriting, composition, production
 Carl Rosen – songwriting, composition
 Manny Marroquin – mixing, studio personnel

Charts

Certifications

References

2019 songs
Juice Wrld songs
Songs written by Juice Wrld
Songs written by Louis Bell
Songs written by Andrew Watt (record producer)
Songs written by Frank Dukes